Walt Woodward III (February 10, 1959 – June 8, 2010) was an American rock drummer who played in several bands, including Shark Island and Saints Or Sinners/The Scream.

He replaced original Saints Or Sinners/The Scream drummer Scott Travis, who left the band to replace drummer Dave Holland in Judas Priest, in 1989.

Walt started his career in the New York/New Jersey area, playing in Rachel, featuring Riot vocalist Rhett Forrester, and Americade, as well as several other bands. His move to California enabled him to be a part of Sweet Savage, Shark Island and The Scream. Walt also did a worldwide tour with surf guitar legend Dick Dale.

He was also in a three-day line-up with the heavy metal band, Twisted Sister in March 1982.

Walt returned to New Jersey and played in various local bands, including The Painkillers.

Death
Woodward was pronounced dead on June 8, 2010. He died of alcohol poisoning.

Discography

with The Scream
 Let It Scream (1991)
 Encino Man OST (1992)
 Takin' It To The Next Level (1993; unreleased)

with Shark Island
 S'cool Buss (1987)

with Americade
 American Metal (1982)
 Americade.com (1995)
 Americadence 1980 ~ 1995 (2011, 5-CD boxed set)

References

External links

The Scream (band) members
1959 births
2010 deaths
Twisted Sister members
American heavy metal drummers
Alcohol-related deaths